José Venancio López (May 13, 1791 in New Guatemala de la Asunción, General Captaincy of Guatemala – September 26, 1863 in Ibid, Guatemala) was a prominent Guatemalan jurist and politician, First President of the Supreme Court, president of the Chamber of Representatives and became 2nd President of the State of Guatemala (25 February 1842 to 14 May 1842). After retiring to private life, he was regent of the chair of law at the National and Pontifical University of San Carlos Borromeo.

References 

1791 births
1863 deaths
Presidents of Guatemala
Justices of the Supreme Court of Justice of Guatemala
Presidents of the Congress of Guatemala